The House of Wittelsbach is a former German dynasty, with branches that have ruled over territories including Bavaria, the Palatinate, Holland and Zeeland, Sweden (with Finland), Denmark, Norway, Hungary (with Romania), Bohemia, the Electorate of Cologne and other prince-bishoprics, and Greece. Their ancestral lands of the Palatinate and Bavaria were Prince-electorates, and the family had three of its members elected emperors and kings of the Holy Roman Empire. They ruled over the Kingdom of Bavaria which was created in 1805 and continued to exist until 1918.

The House of Windsor, the reigning royal house of the British monarchy, are descendants of Sophia of Hanover, a Wittelsbach Princess of the Palatinate by birth and Electress of Hanover by marriage, who had inherited the succession rights of the House of Stuart and passed them on to the House of Hanover.

History
When Otto I, Count of Scheyern, died in 1072, his third son Otto II, Count of Scheyern, acquired the castle of Wittelsbach (near Aichach). The Counts of Scheyern left Scheyern Castle (constructed around 940) in 1119 for Wittelsbach Castle and the former was given to monks to establish Scheyern Abbey. The origins of the counts of Scheyern are unclear. Some rather speculative theories link them to margrave Henry of Schweinfurt and his father Berthold whose background is also disputed; some guess the Schweinfurters may be descendants of the Luitpolding dynasty, the Bavarian dukes of the 10th century.

The Wittelsbach Conrad of Scheyern-Dachau, a great-grandson of Otto I, Count of Scheyern, became Duke of Merania in 1153 and was succeeded by his son Conrad II. It was the first Duchy held by the Wittelsbach family (until 1180/82).

Otto I's eldest son Eckhard I, Count of Scheyern, was father of the Count palatine of Bavaria Otto IV (died 1156), who was the first Count of Wittelsbach and whose son Otto was invested with the Duchy of Bavaria in 1180 after the fall of Henry the Lion and hence the first Bavarian ruler from the House of Wittelsbach. Duke Otto's son Louis I, Duke of Bavaria, acquired also the Electorate of the Palatinate in 1214.

Throughout history, members of the royal house have reigned as: Dukes of Merania (1153–1180/82), Dukes, Electors and Kings of Bavaria (1180–1918), Counts Palatine of the Rhine (1214–1803 and 1816–1918), Margraves of Brandenburg (1323–1373), Counts of Holland, Hainaut and Zeeland (1345–1433), Elector-Archbishops of Cologne (1583–1761), Dukes of Jülich and Berg (1614–1794/1806), Kings of Sweden (1441–1448 and 1654–1720) and Dukes of Bremen-Verden (1654–1719).

The family also provided two Holy Roman Emperors (1328–1347/1742–1745), one King of the Romans (1400–1410), two Anti-Kings of Bohemia (1619–20/1742–43), one King of Hungary (1305–1308), one King of Denmark and Norway (1440–1448) and one King of Greece (1832–1862).

Bavaria and Palatinate within the Holy Roman Empire

The Wittelsbach dynasty ruled the German territories of Bavaria from 1180 to 1918 and the Electorate of the Palatinate from 1214 until 1805. In both countries they had succeeded rulers from the House of Welf. Napoleon elevated Bavaria to a kingdom in 1806 and in 1815 the Palatinate became incorporated as Rhine Palatinate.

On Duke Otto II's death in 1253, his sons divided the Wittelsbach possessions between them: Henry became Duke of Lower Bavaria, and Louis II Duke of Upper Bavaria and Count Palatine of the Rhine. When Henry's branch died out in 1340 the Emperor Louis IV, a son of Duke Louis II, reunited the duchy.

The family provided two Holy Roman Emperors: Louis IV (1314–1347) and Charles VII (1742–1745), both members of the Bavarian branch of the family, and one German King with Rupert of the Palatinate (1400–1410), a member of the Palatinate branch.

The House of Wittelsbach split into these two branches in 1329: Under the Treaty of Pavia, Emperor Louis IV granted the Palatinate including the Bavarian Upper Palatinate to his brother Duke Rudolf's descendants, Rudolf II, Rupert I and Rupert II. Rudolf I in this way became the ancestor of the older (Palatinate) line of the Wittelsbach dynasty, which returned to power also in Bavaria in 1777 after the extinction of the younger (Bavarian) line, the descendants of Louis IV.

Bavarian branch
The Bavarian branch kept the duchy of Bavaria until its extinction in 1777.

The Wittelsbach Emperor Louis IV acquired Brandenburg (1323), Tyrol (1342), Holland, Zeeland and Hainaut (1345) for his House but he had also released the Upper Palatinate for the Palatinate branch of the Wittelsbach in 1329. His six sons succeeded him as Duke of Bavaria and Count of Holland and Hainaut in 1347. The Wittelsbachs lost the Tyrol with the death of duke Meinhard and the following Peace of Schärding  – the Tyrol was finally renounced to the Habsburgs in 1369. In 1373 Otto, the last Wittelsbach regent of Brandenburg, released the country to the House of Luxembourg. On Duke Albert's death in 1404, he was succeeded in the Netherlands by his eldest son, William. A younger son, John III, became Bishop of Liège. However, on William's death in 1417, a war of succession broke out between John and William's daughter Jacqueline of Hainaut. This last episode of the Hook and Cod wars finally left the counties in Burgundian hands in 1433.
Emperor Louis IV had reunited Bavaria in 1340 but from 1349 onwards Bavaria was split among the descendants of Louis IV, who created the branches Bavaria-Landshut, Bavaria-Straubing, Bavaria-Ingolstadt and Bavaria-Munich. With the Landshut War of Succession Bavaria was reunited in 1505 against the claim of the Palatinate branch under the Bavarian branch Bavaria-Munich.

From 1549 to 1567 the Wittelsbach owned the County of Kladsko in Bohemia.

Strictly Catholic by upbringing, the Bavarian dukes became leaders of the German Counter-Reformation. From 1583 to 1761, the Bavarian branch of the dynasty provided the Prince-electors and Archbishops of Cologne and many other Bishops of the Holy Roman Empire, namely Liège (1581–1763). Wittelsbach princes served for example as Bishops of Regensburg, Freising, Liège, Münster, Hildesheim, Paderborn and Osnabrück, and as Grand Masters of the Teutonic Order.

In 1623 under Maximilian I the Bavarian dukes were invested with the electoral dignity and the duchy became the Electorate of Bavaria. His grandson Maximilian II Emanuel, Elector of Bavaria served also as Governor of the Habsburg Netherlands (1692–1706) and as Duke of Luxembourg (1712–1714). His son Emperor Charles VII was also king of Bohemia (1741–1743). With the death of Charles' son Maximilian III Joseph, Elector of Bavaria the Bavarian branch died out in 1777.

Palatinate branch

The Palatinate branch kept the Palatinate until 1918, having succeeded also to Bavaria in 1777. With the Golden Bull of 1356 the Counts Palatine were invested with the electoral dignity, their county became the Electorate of the Palatinate. Princes of the Palatinate branch served as Bishops of the Empire and also as Elector-Archbishops of Mainz and Elector-Archbishops of Trier.

After the death of the Wittelsbach king Rupert of Germany in 1410 the Palatinate lands began to split under numerous branches of the family such as Neumarkt, Simmern, Zweibrücken, Birkenfeld, Neuburg and Sulzbach. When the senior branch of the Palatinate branch died out in 1559, the Electorate passed to Frederick III of Simmern, a staunch Calvinist, and the Palatinate became one of the major centers of Calvinism in Europe, supporting Calvinist rebellions in both the Netherlands and France.

The Neuburg cadet branch of the Palatinate branch also held the Duchy of Jülich and Berg from 1614 onwards: When the last duke of Jülich-Cleves-Berg died without direct heirs in 1609, the War of the Jülich succession broke out, ended by the 1614 Treaty of Xanten, which divided the separate duchies between Palatinate-Neuburg and the Margraviate of Brandenburg. Jülich and Berg fell to the Wittelsbach Count Palatine Wolfgang William of Neuburg.

In 1619, the Protestant Frederick V, Elector Palatine became King of Bohemia but was defeated by the Catholic Maximilian I, Elector of Bavaria, a member of the Bavarian branch. As a result, the Upper Palatinate had to be ceded to the Bavarian branch in 1623. When the Thirty Years' War concluded with the Treaty of Münster (also called the Peace of Westphalia) in 1648, a new additional electorate was created for the Count Palatine of the Rhine. During their exile Frederick's sons, especially Prince Rupert of the Rhine, gained fame in England.

The house of Palatinate of Zweibrücken-Kleeburg as heir to the Swedish throne ruled simultaneously the duchy of Bremen-Verden (1654–1719).

In 1685, the Simmern line died out, and the Catholic Philip William, Count Palatine of Neuburg inherited the Palatinate (and also Duke of Jülich and Berg). During the reign of Johann Wilhelm (1690–1716) the Electoral residence moved to Düsseldorf in Berg. His brother and successor Charles III Philip, Elector Palatine moved the Palatinate's capital back to Heidelberg in 1718 and then to Mannheim in 1720.  To strengthen the union of all lines of the Wittelsbach dynasty Charles Philip organized a wedding on 17 January 1742 when his granddaughters were married to Charles Theodore of Palatinate-Sulzbach and to the Bavarian prince Clement. In the imperial election a few days later Charles III Philip voted for his Bavarian cousin Prince-Elector Charles Albert. After extinction of the Neuburg branch in 1742, the Palatinate was inherited by Duke Charles Theodore of the branch Palatinate-Sulzbach.

After the extinction of the Bavarian branch in 1777, a succession dispute and the brief War of the Bavarian Succession, the Palatinate-Sulzbach branch under Elector Charles Theodore succeeded also in Bavaria.

With the death of Charles Theodore in 1799 all Wittelsbach land in Bavaria and the Palatinate was reunited under Maximilian IV Joseph, a member of the branch Palatinate-Zweibrücken-Birkenfeld. At the time there were two surviving branches of the Wittelsbach family: Palatinate-Zweibrücken (headed by Maximilian Joseph) and Palatinate-Birkenfeld (headed by Count Palatine William).  Maximilian Joseph inherited Charles Thedore's title of Elector of Bavaria, while William was compensated with the title of Duke in Bavaria. The form Duke in Bavaria was selected because in 1506 primogeniture had been established in the House of Wittelsbach resulting in there being only one Reigning Duke of Bavaria at any given time. Maximillian Joseph assumed the title of king as Maximilian I Joseph on 1 January 1806. The new king still served as a Prince-elector until the Kingdom of Bavaria left the Holy Roman Empire (1 August 1806).

Kingdom of Bavaria, 1806–1918

Under Maximilian's descendants, Bavaria became the third most powerful German state, behind only Prussia and Austria.  It was also far-and-away the most powerful secondary state.  When the German Empire was formed in 1871, Bavaria became the new empire's second most powerful state after Prussia.  The Wittelsbachs reigned as kings of Bavaria until 1918. On 12 November 1918 Ludwig III issued the Anif declaration (German: Anifer Erklärung) at Anif Palace, Austria, in which he released his soldiers and officials from their oath of loyalty to him and ended the 738-year rule of the House of Wittelsbach in Bavaria. The republican movement thereupon declared a republic.

Activities during the Nazi regime, 1933–1945
Before and during the Second World War, the Wittelsbachs were anti-Nazi. Crown Prince Rupert earned Hitler's eternal enmity by opposing the Beer Hall Putsch in 1923. The family initially left Germany for Hungary, but were eventually arrested. Family members spent time in several Nazi concentration camps including Oranienburg and Dachau.

Reign outside the Holy Roman Empire
With Duke Otto III of Lower Bavaria, who was a maternal grandson of Béla IV of Hungary and was elected anti-king of Hungary and Croatia as Bela V (1305–1308) the Wittelsbach dynasty came to power outside the Holy Roman Empire for the first time. Otto had abdicated the Hungarian throne by 1308.

Palatinate branch
Christopher III of the House of Palatinate-Neumarkt was king of Denmark, Sweden and Norway in 1440/1442–1448, but he left no descendants. The House of Palatinate-Zweibrücken contributed to the monarchy of Sweden again 1654–1720 under Charles X, Charles XI, Charles XII and Ulrika Eleonora. Sophia from the House of Palatinate-Simmern was a presumptive Queen of Great Britain, with her eldest son succeeding the throne.

United Kingdom
Today, under the Bill of Rights 1689 and the Act of Settlement 1701, the line of succession to the throne stems from the Protestant descendants of Sophia of Hannover (1630–1714). She was heiress presumptive of Great Britain but died before her succession to the British throne. Her eldest son succeeded the throne in her place as George I of Great Britain, a descendant of the Houses of Hanover and Wittelsbach.

The line of Jacobite succession, which recognises the right for a Catholic monarch from the House of Stuart, acknowledges Franz, Hereditary Prince of Bavaria to be the rightful heir as "Francis II". However, no claimant since Henry Benedict Stuart has publicly taken up the claim.

Kingdom of Sweden

Queen Christina of Sweden abdicated her throne on 5 June 1654 in favour of her cousin Charles X Gustav, a member of the Wittelsbach branch Palatinate-Zweibrücken. It was the second term for the rule of the House of Wittelsbach in Sweden since 1448 when Christopher III of the Palatinate branch was elected king of Denmark, Sweden and Norway.

Sweden reached its largest territorial extent under the rule of Charles X after the Treaty of Roskilde in 1658. Charles's son, Charles XI, rebuilt the economy and refitted the army. His legacy to his son, Charles XII, was one of the finest arsenals in the world, a large standing army and a great fleet. Charles XII was a skilled military leader and tactician. However, although he was also skilled as a politician, he was reluctant in making peace. While Sweden achieved several large scale military successes early on, and won the most battles, the Great Northern War eventually ended in Sweden's defeat and the end of the Swedish Empire. Charles was succeeded to the Swedish throne by his sister, Ulrika Eleonora. Her abdication in favour of her husband Frederick I in 1720 marked the end of Wittelsbach rule in Sweden.

Kingdom of Greece

Prince Otto of Bavaria was elected king of newly independent Greece in 1832 and was forced to abdicate in 1862. King Otto I of the House of Wittelsbach was made the first King of modern Greece in 1832 under the Convention of London, whereby Greece became a new independent kingdom under the protection of the Great Powers (the United Kingdom, France and the Russian Empire). Throughout his reign, Otto faced political challenges concerning Greece's financial weakness and the role of the government in the affairs of the Church. The politics of Greece of this era was based on affiliations with the three Great Powers, and Otto's ability to maintain the support of the powers was key to his remaining in power.  To remain strong, Otto had to play the interests of each of the Great Powers’ Greek adherents against the others, while not aggravating the Great Powers. When Greece was blockaded by the (British) Royal Navy in 1850 and again in 1853, to stop Greece from attacking the Ottoman Empire during the Crimean War, Otto's standing amongst Greeks suffered. As a result, there was an assassination attempt on the Queen and finally, in 1862, Otto was deposed while in the countryside. In 1863 the Greek National Assembly elected Prince William of Denmark, aged only 17, King of the Hellenes under the regal name of George I.

The law of succession to the throne of Greece was defined by a supplementary article to the convention of 7 May 1832 awarding the Greek Throne to Otto I. It instituted a semi-salic order with an important rule preventing the union of the crown on the same head with any other crown, especially that of Bavaria. The 1844 constitution further made provision for his succession by his two younger brothers (Luitpold and Prince Adalbert of Bavaria) and their descendants.

Under the terms of the succession law, a Wittelsbach claim to the throne would have passed on Otto's death in 1867 to his younger brother Luitpold, who was regent of Bavaria from 1886 to 1912; and theoritically after him to Ludwig who became king Ludwig III of Bavaria in 1913. At this point, tracing the claim becomes problematic as the same branch of the Wittelsbach became heir to both thrones, and a subsequent monarch or pretender should have issued a renunciation to one of the two thrones, which none did. In the end, neither Luitpold nor his son Ludwig actively pursued a claim to the Greek throne inherited from Otto, and the throne of Bavaria itself disappeared in 1918, leaving the future of the claim to be decided by a further arrangement that never occurred.

However, Ludwig's marriage to Maria Theresia of Austria-Este in 1868 came with a caveat. Maria Theresa's uncle, Duke Francis V of Modena, was a staunch Roman Catholic. He required that as part of the marriage agreement Ludwig renounce his rights to the throne of Greece, and so ensure that his children would be raised Roman Catholic. In addition, the 1844 Greek Constitution forbade the Greek sovereign to be simultaneously ruler of another country. Consequently, Ludwig's younger brother Prince Leopold of Bavaria technically succeeded upon their father's death in 1912 to the rights of the deposed Otto of Greece.

The line of succession under Leopold didn't survive for long. Following Leopold's death in 1930, the throne technically passed to his son Prince Georg of Bavaria who died in 1943 (who might renounced the throne anyway because of his status as Catholic priest) without issue. After Prince Georg's death, the throne passed to his younger brother Prince Konrad of Bavaria who died in 1969. Konrad's only child, Prince Eugen of Bavaria died in 1997 without issue. As the line Ludwig III and Leopold's younger brother, Prince Arnulf of Bavaria, ended earlier by the death of his son, Prince Heinrich of Bavaria, in 1916. In 1997 the throne would pass to a descendant of Prince Adalbert of Bavaria

Prince Adalbert had two sons, Prince Ludwig Ferdinand of Bavaria and Prince Alfons of Bavaria. However, Prince Alfons' only son, Prince Joseph Clemens of Bavaria died in 1990 without issue. Thus only a descendant of Prince Ludwig Ferdinand could potentially ascend the throne. Prince Ludwig Ferdinand had two sons, Prince Ferdinand of Bavaria and Prince Adalbert of Bavaria (1886–1970). 

However, as Prince Ferdinand renounced his rights to the throne of the Kingdom of Bavaria on 29 June 1914, it was likely that Prince Ferdinand would also renounce his rights to the throne of the Kingdom of Greece. This is perhaps due to his marriage in 1905 to Infanta María Teresa of Spain, the second eldest child and daughter of Alfonso XII of Spain, which gave him royal rank in Spain, and his planned second marriage which happened on 1 October 1914 (three months after the World War started). It is worth noting that he renounced his dynastic rights on 29 June 1914, only a day after the assassination of Franz Ferdinand, and thus the reasons spelled out here might not come to play. The issue is moot anyway, as of Prince Ferdinand's two sons, Infante Luis Alfonso died unmarried in 1983, and Infante Jose Eugenio's marriage to María de la Asunción Solange de Messía y Lesseps (only made a countess of Odiel a day before their marriage) was considered morganatic. Even if Infante Jose Eugnio's children are considered as the Greek throne has no concept of morganatic marriage, his two sons, Ferdinand of Bavaria and Mesía (1937-1999) only had a daughter, while Luis Alfonso of Bavaria and Mesía (1942-1966) died without issue. Thus the throne would only pass for two short years since 1997 to 1999 from Prince Eugen to Don Ferdinand of Bavaria and Mesía.

Prince Adalbert of Bavaria (1886–1970) had two sons, Prince Konstantin of Bavaria (1920–1969) and Prince Alexander of Bavaria (1923-2001). Prince Konstantin had two sons, Prince Leopold of Bavaria (born 1943) and Prince Adalbert (born 1944). Thus from the long line, the throne would either pass from Prince Eugen in 1997 or 1999 Don Ferdinand of Bavaria and Mesía to Prince Leopold as the current pretender.

Bavarian branch
Joseph Ferdinand, a son of Maximilian II Emanuel, was the favored choice of England and the Netherlands to succeed as the ruler of Spain, and young Charles II of Spain chose him as his heir. Due to the unexpected death of Joseph Ferdinand in 1699 the Wittelsbach did not come to power in Spain, leaving the Spanish Succession uncertain again.

Major members of the family
Many women in the family are known as Elisabeth of Bavaria.

Patrilineal descent

 
 

Duke Franz's patriline is the line from which he is descended father to son.  Patrilineal descent is the principle behind membership in royal houses, as it can be traced back through the generations.
Heinrich I, Count of Pegnitz, 1008–1043
Otto I, Count of Scheyern, 1020–1072
Eckhard I, Count of Scheyern, 1044-1088
Otto IV, Count of Wittelsbach, 1083–1156
Otto I, Duke of Bavaria, 1117–1183
Louis I, Duke of Bavaria, 1173–1231
Otto II Wittelsbach, Duke of Bavaria, 1206–1253
Louis II, Duke of Bavaria, 1229–1294
Rudolf I, Duke of Bavaria, 1274–1319
Adolf, Count Palatine of the Rhine, 1300–1327
Rupert II, Elector Palatine, 1325–1398
Rupert of Germany, 1352–1410
Stephen, Count Palatine of Simmern-Zweibrücken, 1385–1459
Louis I, Count Palatine of Zweibrücken, 1424–1489
Alexander, Count Palatine of Zweibrücken, 1462–1514
Louis II, Count Palatine of Zweibrücken, 1502–1532
Wolfgang, Count Palatine of Zweibrücken, 1526–1569
Charles I, Count Palatine of Zweibrücken-Birkenfeld, 1560–1600
Christian I, Count Palatine of Birkenfeld-Bischweiler, 1598–1654
Christian II, Count Palatine of Zweibrücken, 1637–1717
Christian III, Count Palatine of Zweibrücken, 1674–1735
Count Palatine Frederick Michael of Zweibrücken, 1724–1767
Maximilian I Joseph of Bavaria, 1756–1825
Ludwig I of Bavaria, 1786–1868
Luitpold, Prince Regent of Bavaria, 1821–1912
Ludwig III of Bavaria, 1845–1921
Rupprecht, Crown Prince of Bavaria, 1869–1955
Albrecht, Duke of Bavaria, 1905–1996
Franz, Duke of Bavaria, b. 1933

Bavarian branch
Louis V, Margrave of Brandenburg, Duke of Bavaria and Count of Tyrol (1323–1361)
Albert I, Duke of Bavaria, Count of Holland and Hainaut (1347–1404)
Isabeau de Bavière (1371–1435), queen-consort of France
Ernest, Duke of Bavaria (1397–1438) duke of Bavaria-Munich
Albert III, Duke of Bavaria (1438–1460) duke of Bavaria-Munich
Jacqueline, Countess of Hainaut and Holland (1417–1432)
Albert IV, Duke of Bavaria (1465–1508)
William IV, Duke of Bavaria (1508–1550), co-regent Louis X from 1516 to 1545
Louis X, Duke of Bavaria (1516–1545) 
Albert V, Duke of Bavaria (1550–1579)
Maximilian I, Elector of Bavaria (1597–1651)
Maria Anna, Dauphine of France (1660–1690)
Maximilian II Emanuel, Elector of Bavaria (1662–1726)
Duchess Violante Beatrice of Bavaria (1673–1731), Hereditary Princess of Tuscany and Governess of Siena,
Clemens August of Bavaria (1700–1761)
Maria Antonia of Bavaria (1724–1780)

Palatinate branch
Frederick I, Elector Palatine (1451–1476)
Frederick III, Elector Palatine (1559–1576)
Frederick V, Elector Palatine (1610–1623), King of Bohemia (the "Winter King")
Charles I Louis, Elector Palatine (1648–1680)
Prince Rupert of the Rhine (1619–1682)
Sophia of the Palatine (1630–1714), daughter of Frederick V, Heiress to the British throne, mother of King George I of Great Britain
Elizabeth Charlotte, Princess Palatine (1652–1722)
Johann Wilhelm, Elector Palatine (1690–1718), his wife Anna Maria Luisa de' Medici being the last scion of the House of Medici
King Ludwig I of Bavaria (1825–1848)
Princess Sophie of Bavaria (1805–1872), Archduchess of Austria
Elisabeth in Bavaria (1837–1898) ("Sisi"), Empress of Austria
Ludwig II of Bavaria (1864–1886)
Marie Sophie (1841–1925), last queen of the Kingdom of the Two Sicilies
Elisabeth of Bavaria (1876–1965), queen-consort of Albert I of Belgium
Sophie, Hereditary Princess of Liechtenstein, b. 1967

Scandinavian kings
Christopher of Denmark, Norway and Sweden, reigned 1440–1448
Charles X Gustav of Sweden, reigned 1654–1660
Charles XI of Sweden, reigned 1660–1697
Charles XII of Sweden, reigned 1697–1718
Ulrika Eleonora of Sweden, reigned 1718–1720

Family tree

Living Legitimate Members of the Wittlesbach

-->

Ludwig I of Bavaria (1786-1868)
Luitpold (1821-1912)
Ludwig III of Bavaria 1845-1921
Rupprecht, Crown Prince of Bavaria (1869-1955)
Albrecht, Duke of Bavaria (1905-1996)
 (1) Franz, Duke of Bavaria (1933)
 (2) Max, Duke in Bavaria (1937)
 Franz, Prince of Bavaria (1875-1957)
 Ludwig, Prince of Bavaria (1913–2008)
 (3) Luitpold, Prince of Bavaria (b. 1951)
 (4) Ludwig Heinrich, Prince(born 14 June 1982)
 (5) Heinrich Rudolf, Prince (born 23 January 1986)
 (6) Maximilian, Prince (born 2021)
 (7) Karl Rupprecht, Prince (born 10 March 1987)
 Rasso Maximilian Rupprecht, Prince of Bavaria (1926-2011)
 (8) Wolfgang Rupprecht Maria Theodor of Bavaria (born 1960)
 (9) Tassilo, Prince (born 1992)
 (10) Richard, Prince (born 1993)
 (11) Philip. Prince (born 1996)
 (12) Christoph Ludwig Maria of Bavaria (born 1962)
 (13) Corbinian, Prince (born 1996)
 (14) Stanislaus, Prince (born 1997)
 (15) Marcello. Prince (born 1998)
 Prince Adalbert of Bavaria (1828–1875)
 Ludwig Ferdinand, Prince of Bavaria (1859-1949)
 Adalbert, Prince of Bavaria (1886–1970)
 Konstantin, Prince of Bavaria (1920-1969)
 (16) Leopold, Prince of Bavaria (born 1943), potential Wittlesbach pretender to the throne of Greece due to Ludwig III's renunciation of the Greek throne for him and his descendants.
 (17) Manuel, Prince (born 1972)
 (18) Leopold, Prince (born 2007)
 (19) Gabriel, Prince (born 2010)
 (20) Joseph, Prince (born 2019)
 (21) Konstantin, Prince (born 1986)
 (22) Alexis, Prince (born 2020)
 (23) Adalbert, Prince (born 1944)
 (24) Hubertus, Prince of Bavaria (born 1989)

Castles and palaces

Bavaria
Some of the most important Bavarian castles and palaces that were built by Wittelsbach rulers, or served as seats of ruling branch lines, are the following:

Palatinate branch
Some of the most important castles and palaces of the Palatinate Wittelsbach were:

Electorate of Cologne
From 1597 to 1794, Bonn was the capital of the Electorate of Cologne and residence of the Archbishops and Prince-electors of Cologne, most of them belonging to the Bavarian branch of the House of Wittelsbach (continuously from 1583 to 1761).

Coats of arms
A full armorial of the Wittelsbach family can be found on the French-language Wikipedia at Armorial of the House of Wittelsbach.

Palatinate branch (senior line), issue of Rudolph I of the Palatine and Bavaria

Bavarian branch (junior branch), issue of Louis of Bavaria, extinct by 1777

See also

 Kings of Germany family tree
 List of rulers of Bavaria
 List of rulers of the Palatinate
 Asteroid 90712 Wittelsbach, named in the castle and dynasty's honour
 Wittelsbach Diamond
 Monarchism in Bavaria after 1918
 List of coats of arms with the Palatine Lion

Notes

References
 Héraldique Européenne.

External links

Haus Bayern – webpage of the Royal House of Bavaria (in German)
Archived website about the Royal Family of Bavaria
Haus Bayern – Wittelsbacher Ausgleichsfonds – Wittelsbach foundation (in German)
Die Genealogie der Wittelsbacher – Genealogy of the Wittelsbach family (in German)

|-

|-

|-

|-

 
Duchy of Bavaria
Electorate of Bavaria
History of the Palatinate (region)
Ruling families of the County of Holland
Ruling families of the Duchy of Berg